In mathematical analysis, the Weierstrass approximation theorem states that every continuous function defined on a closed interval  can be uniformly approximated as closely as desired by a polynomial function. Because polynomials are among the simplest functions, and because computers can directly evaluate polynomials, this theorem has both practical and theoretical relevance, especially in polynomial interpolation. The original version of this result was established by Karl Weierstrass in 1885 using the Weierstrass transform.

Marshall H. Stone considerably generalized the theorem  and simplified the proof . His result is known as the Stone–Weierstrass theorem. The Stone–Weierstrass theorem is a vital result in the study of the algebra of continuous functions on a compact Hausdorff space.

Further, there is a generalization of the Stone–Weierstrass theorem to noncompact Tychonoff spaces, namely, any continuous function on a Tychonoff space is approximated uniformly on compact sets by algebras of the type appearing in the Stone–Weierstrass theorem and described below.

A different generalization of Weierstrass' original theorem is Mergelyan's theorem, which generalizes it to functions defined on certain subsets of the complex plane.

Weierstrass approximation theorem 
The statement of the approximation theorem as originally discovered by Weierstrass is as follows:

A constructive proof of this theorem using Bernstein polynomials is outlined on that page.

Applications 
As a consequence of the Weierstrass approximation theorem, one can show that the space  is separable: the polynomial functions are dense, and each polynomial function can be uniformly approximated by one with rational coefficients; there are only countably many polynomials with rational coefficients. Since  is metrizable and separable it follows that  has cardinality at most .  (Remark: This cardinality result also follows from the fact that a continuous function on the reals is uniquely determined by its restriction to the rationals.)

Stone–Weierstrass theorem, real version 

Now we may state:

Locally compact version 
A version of the Stone–Weierstrass theorem is also true when  is only locally compact. Again,  is a Banach algebra with the supremum norm. The theorem generalizes as follows:

This version clearly implies the previous version in the case when  is compact, since in that case . There are also more general versions of the Stone–Weierstrass that weaken the assumption of local compactness.

Applications 
The Stone–Weierstrass theorem can be used to prove the following two statements, which go beyond Weierstrass's result.

The theorem has many other applications to analysis, including:

Stone–Weierstrass theorem, complex version 
Slightly more general is the following theorem, where we consider the algebra   of complex-valued continuous functions on the compact space , again with the topology of uniform convergence. This is a C*-algebra with the *-operation given by pointwise complex conjugation.

This theorem implies the real version, because if a net of complex-valued functions uniformly approximates a given function, then the real parts of those functions uniformly approximate the real part of that function, and because for real subsets,  taking the real parts of the generated complex unital (selfadjoint) algebra agrees with the generated real unital algebra generated.

As in the real case, an analog of this theorem is true for locally compact Hausdorff spaces.

Stone–Weierstrass theorem, quaternion version 
Following , consider the algebra  of quaternion-valued continuous functions on the compact space , again with the topology of uniform convergence. 

If a quaternion  is written in the form 
its scalar part  is the real number .
Likewise 

Then we may state:

Stone–Weierstrass theorem, C*-algebra version 
The space of complex-valued continuous functions on a compact Hausdorff space  i.e.  is the canonical example of a unital commutative C*-algebra . Following the above cue, a non-commutative extension of the Stone–Weierstrass theorem, which remains unsolved, is as follows:

In 1960, Jim Glimm proved a weaker version of the above conjecture.

Lattice versions 
Let  be a compact Hausdorff space. The lattice version of the Stone–Weierstrass theorem states:

A variant of the theorem applies to linear subspaces of  closed under max :

More precise information is available:

Bishop's theorem 
Another generalization of the Stone–Weierstrass theorem is due to Errett Bishop.  Bishop's theorem is as follows :

See also .

Nachbin's theorem 
Nachbin's theorem gives an analog for Stone–Weierstrass theorem for algebras of complex valued smooth functions on a smooth manifold . Nachbin's theorem is as follows :

Editorial history
In 1885 it was also published in an English version of the paper whose title was On the possibility of giving an analytic representation to an arbitrary function of real variable. According to the mathematician Yamilet Quintana, Weierstrass "suspected that any analytic functions could be represented by power series".

See also 
Müntz–Szász theorem
 Bernstein polynomial
 Runge's phenomenon shows that finding a polynomial  such that  for some finely spaced  is a bad way to attempt to find a polynomial approximating  uniformly.
 Mergelyan's theorem, concerning polynomial approximations of complex functions.

Notes

References 
 .
 .
 Jan Brinkhuis & Vladimir Tikhomirov (2005) Optimization: Insights and Applications, Princeton University Press  .
 
 .
 .
 .
 .
 .
 
 
 .

Historical works 
The historical publication of Weierstrass (in German language) is freely available from the digital online archive of the Berlin Brandenburgische Akademie der Wissenschaften:

 K. Weierstrass (1885). Über die analytische Darstellbarkeit sogenannter willkürlicher Functionen einer reellen Veränderlichen. Sitzungsberichte der Königlich Preußischen Akademie der Wissenschaften zu Berlin, 1885 (II).  Erste Mitteilung (part 1) pp. 633–639, Zweite Mitteilung (part 2) pp. 789–805.

Important historical works of Stone include:

 .
 ; 21 (5), 237–254.

External links 
 

Theory of continuous functions
Theorems in analysis
Theorems in approximation theory
1885 in mathematics
1937 in mathematics